"Our Father" is the opening phrase of the Lord's Prayer.

Our Father may also refer to:

Film and television
 Our Father (1953 film), a Mexican drama film

 Abouna (film), a 2002 Chadian film with the English-language title Our Father
 Our Father (2015 film), a British short film
 Our Father (2016 film), an Israeli drama film
 Our Father (2022 film), an American Netflix documentary film about notorious fertility doctor Donald Cline
 "Our Father" (Heroes), a 2008 episode of the TV series Heroes
 "Our Father" (Dexter), a 2008 episode of the TV series Dexter

Other
Our Father (cantata), a 1901 setting of the Lord’s Prayer to music

See also
 Our Fathers (disambiguation)
 Padre nuestro (disambiguation)